The 1903–04 season was the 33rd season of competitive football in England.

For the first time ever, a London (and Southern) team, Woolwich Arsenal, were promoted to the First Division and made the league's reach nationwide. They joined champions Preston North End in the top flight, after the Lilywhites beat arch-rivals Blackpool in the final game of the season to clinch the championship. Bradford City replaced Doncaster Rovers.

Honours

Notes = Number in parentheses is the times that club has won that honour. * indicates new record for competition

Football League

First Division

Second Division

References